Christopher T. Robinson is an American diplomat who served as the United States ambassador to Latvia since February 2023.

Early life and education
Robinson received a Master of Science in strategic studies from the National War College and a Bachelor of Arts in international affairs from George Washington University.

Career
Robinson is a career member of the Senior Foreign Service with the rank of Minister-Counselor. He has served as Deputy Assistant Secretary in the Bureau of European and Eurasian Affairs since 2018. Robinson previously was Minister Counselor for Political Affairs at U.S. Embassy in Moscow, Russia. He also served as deputy director for Russian Affairs at the State Department, as Political Counselor at the U.S. Mission to the Organization for Security and Cooperation in Europe (OSCE) in Vienna, Austria, and as Political Counselor in Managua, Nicaragua. His overseas assignments include Iraq, Belarus, Canada, and Russia; he has also had assignments in the Bureau of Western Hemisphere Affairs and the Bureau of European Affairs.

U.S. ambassador to Latvia
On June 15, 2022, President Joe Biden nominated Robinson to be the next ambassador to Latvia. On November 29, 2022, Hearings on his nomination were held before the Senate Foreign Relations Committee. On December 7, 2022, the committee favorably reported his nomination to the Senate. On December 13, 2022, his nomination was confirmed in the Senate by voice vote. He was sworn in on January 26, 2023, and presented his credentials to President Egils Levits on February 21, 2023.

Awards and recognitions
He is the recipient of multiple State Department performance awards, including a Distinguished Honor Award and Meritorious Honor Award.

Personal life
Robinson speaks Russian and Spanish.

References

Living people
National War College alumni
George Washington University alumni
American diplomats
United States Foreign Service personnel
Ambassadors of the United States to Latvia
Year of birth missing (living people)